The 2012 Cincinnati Bearcats football team represented the University of Cincinnati as a member of th  Big East Conference during the 2012 NCAA Division I FBS football season. The Bearcats, led by third-year head coach Butch Jones, played their home games at Nippert Stadium. They finished the season 10–3 overall and 5–2 in Big East play to place in a four-way tie for the conference championship. Along with Rutgers, Louisville, and Syracuse, the Bearcats were the final football champions of the Big East Conference, as the league's original incarnation folded following the loss of the three former programs and others to different conferences. Cincinnati became a charter member of the American Athletic Conference the following season.

The 2012 Cincinnati team was invited to the Belk Bowl where they defeated Duke. At the end of the regular season, Jones resigned to take the same head coaching position at Tennessee. Defensive line coach Steve Stripling was named the interim head coach for the Belk Bowl.

Schedule

Game summaries

Pittsburgh

Delaware State

Virginia Tech

Miami (OH)

Fordham

@ Toledo

@ Louisville

Syracuse

@ Temple

Rutgers

South Florida

@ Connecticut

Duke–Belk Bowl

The Bearcats made their first ever appearance in the Belk Bowl and their first ever meeting with Duke. The Blue Devils raced out to an early 16-0 lead in the first quarter after a punt was blocked and recovered for a touchdown. The Bearcats then scored 27 unanswered points capped off by a 46 yard touchdown run by George Winn. The Blue Devils then scored back to back touchdowns to take a 31-27 lead. The Bearcats retook the lead with a 25 yard touchdown pass from Brendan Kay to Chris Moore. The Blue Devils then tied the game with a 52 yard field goal and the game seemed headed to overtime. With under a minute to play TE Travis Kelce took a short pass from Kay and broke several would be tackles in racing 83 yards for the winning score. Insult was added to injury when Nick Temple stripped the ball from Duke QB Sean Renfree and dashed 55 yards with the stolen loaf for a score as time expired. The 48 points is the most points scored by the Bearcats in a bowl game, and would be their largest margin of victory in a bowl game since 1997. This also gave the Bearcats their first consecutive bowl wins since 1946-47 The win gave the Bearcats their 4th 10 win season in the past five years.

Roster

Depth chart

Awards and milestones

Big East Conference honors

Big East Conference All-Conference First Team

George Winn, RB
Travis Kelce, TE
Eric Lefeld, OL

Big East Conference All-Conference Second Team

Austen Bujnoch, OL

Dan Giordano, DL
Greg Blair, LB
Pat O'Donnell, P

Big East Conference All-Conference Third Team

Ralph David Abernathy IV, KR

Walter Stewart, DL
Maalik Bomar, LB
Drew Frey, DB
Anthony McClung, PR

Rankings

Players in the 2013 NFL draft

References

Cincinnati
Cincinnati Bearcats football seasons
Big East Conference football champion seasons
Lambert-Meadowlands Trophy seasons
Duke's Mayo Bowl champion seasons
Cincinnati Bearcats football